Alexander Remezkov (born 7 April 1962, Urgench, Xorazm Region) is a Russian political figure and a deputy of the 6th, 7th, and 8th State Dumas.
 
At the beginning of the 1990s, Remezkov engaged in business. From 1994 to 1998, he worked as financial director of the enterprise Association Eksim. In 1998, he was elected deputy of the Legislative Assembly of Krasnodar Krai. In 2001, he was appointed head of the administration of Krasnodar Krai. In 2002-2008, he was the Vice Governor of the Krasnodar Krai Alexander Tkachev. In 2008, he headed the Krasnodar regional branch of the Russian Union of Industrialists and Entrepreneurs. From 2011 to 2016, he served as deputy of the 6th State Duma from the Krasnodar Krai constituency. In 2016 and 2021, he was re-elected deputy of the 7th, and 8th State Dumas.

References
 

 

1962 births
Living people
A Just Russia politicians
21st-century Russian politicians
Eighth convocation members of the State Duma (Russian Federation)
Seventh convocation members of the State Duma (Russian Federation)
Sixth convocation members of the State Duma (Russian Federation)